Are You Lonesome Tonight? may refer to:

"Are You Lonesome Tonight?" (song), a 1926 popular song by Lou Handman and Roy Turk recorded by a number of singers, most famously Elvis Presley
Are You Lonesome Tonight? (play), a 1982 play by Pamela Van Amstel about an Elvis-obsessed family
Are You Lonesome Tonight? (musical), a 1985 musical play by Alan Bleasdale about Presley
Are You Lonesome Tonight? (album), featuring the original London cast
Are You Lonesome Tonight? (1992 film), a 1992 television film directed by E.W. Swackhamer, starring Jane Seymour and Parker Stevenson
Are You Lonesome Tonight? (2021 film), a 2021 Chinese film directed by Wen Shipei, starring Eddie Peng and Sylvia Chang